The Perham Formation is a geologic formation in Maine. It preserves fossils dating back to the Silurian period.

See also

 List of fossiliferous stratigraphic units in Maine
 Paleontology in Maine

References
 

Silurian Maine
Silurian southern paleotemperate deposits